Date and time notation in Australia  most commonly records the date using the day-month-year format, while the ISO 8601 format is increasingly used for all-numeric dates. The time can be written using either the 12-hour clock or the 24-hour clock.

Date
Australians typically write the date with the day leading, as in the United Kingdom and New Zealand:

 
  or 

The month–day–year order is sometimes used, usually informally in the mastheads of magazines, schools, newspapers, advertisements, video games, news, and TV shows. MDY in numeric-only form is rarely used.

The ISO 8601 date format is the recommended short date format for government publications. The first two digits of the year are often omitted in everyday use and on forms.

Weeks are most identified by the last day of the week, either the Friday in business (e.g., "week ending 19/1") or the Sunday in other use (e.g., "week ending 21/1"). Week ending is often abbreviated to "W/E" or "W.E." The first day of the week or the day of an event are sometimes referred to (e.g., "week of 15/1"). Week numbers (as in "the third week of 2007") are not often used, but may appear in some business diaries in numeral-only form (e.g., "3" at the top or bottom of the page). ISO 8601 week notation (e.g. ) is not widely understood. Some more traditional calendars instead treat Sunday as the first day of the week.

Time
The Australian government allows writing the time using either the 24-hour clock, which is commonplace in technical fields such as military, aviation, computing, navigation, transportation and the sciences; or the 12-hour clock. The before noon/after noon qualifier is usually written as "am" or "pm". A colon is the preferred time separator.

References

Time in Australia
Australia